The Prospect Before Us is a British folk rock album, by The Albion Dance Band, which was released in 1977 on the EMI Harvest label.

The album was produced by Ashley Hutchings and Simon Nicol and was engineered by Vic Gamm. It was recorded at Sound Techniques Studio and Olympic (including live dances at Olympic), London. There are several instrumental tracks. The album cover was designed by Dave Dragon, based on an idea by Pete Scowther.

Track listing

Side 1
"Uncle Berhard's"/"Jenny Lind" (instrumental) - 3:44
"The Hunt Is Up" - 1:51
"Varsoviana" (instrumental) - 2:42
"Masque" (instrumental) - 1:00
"Huntsman's Chorus" - 4:25
"Minuet" (instrumental) - 2:05
"Wassail Song" - 2:11
"Picking of Sticks"/ "The Old Mole" (instrumental) - 3:39

Side 2
"Merry Sherwood Rangers" (live version) - 3:18
"La Sexte Estampie Real" (instrumental) - 1:51
"I Wish I was Single Again" - 3:42
"The Whim" (instrumental) - 3:29
"Hopping Down in Kent" - 2:44
"Horse's Brawl" (instrumental) - 3:40

1993 CD bonus tracks
"On Christmas Night All Christians Sing" (The Sussex Carol)
"Merry Sherwood Rangers" (studio version)

Personnel
 Simon Nicol – electric and acoustic guitars, piano
 Michael Gregory – drums, nakers, percussion
 Philip Pickett – curtals, shawms, recorders, crumhorns, bagpipes, racketts, chalumeaux, synthesizer
 John Sothcott, – vielle, citole, crumhorn
 Graeme Taylor – electric guitar, piano
 Ashley Hutchings – leader, electric bass guitar, vocals
 Shirley Collins – vocals
 Eddie Upton – caller, vocals
 John Tams – vocals, melodeon
 John Rodd – concertina, tambourine, vocals
 Dave Mattacks – drums, piano, electric piano

References

The Albion Band albums
1977 albums
Harvest Records albums